Yusufpur and Mohammadabad is a twin town in the Ghazipur district of Uttar Pradesh, India. This town is actually a business hub for other near by districts like Ballia, Mau, Buxar etc.
notable person: Dr. Sri Govind Rai medical practitioner and social worker.(kuch bhi)
Yusufpur has a railway station which lies on the railway line linking Varanasi to Chhapra via Ghazipur and Ballia in the North Eastern Railway Zone.

Notable Individuals
Notable person from this town are listed below:
The late Dr Mukhtar Ahmed Ansari, the ex president of all India congress committee 
The late Brigadier Usman, the recipient of Param veer chakra
The late Subhanalla Ansari, noted social worker
Noted management scholar, professor Dr Shamim Ahmed

Dr. Shivpujan Rai, 
Mangla Rai, 
Hari Narayan Singh, 
Vinod Rai, 
Manoj Sinha, 
Krishnanand Rai, 
Afzal Ansari, 
Mukhtar Ansari, 
Sibakatullah Ansari and 
Hamid Ansari, 
Prasannojeet Chaurasia
Cities and towns in Ghazipur district